John Walter da Silva  (11 June 1934 – 8 April 2021) was a New Zealand wrestler and boxer.

Biography
Da Silva was born on 11 June 1934. He represented New Zealand in wrestling at the 1956 Olympics and at the 1958 British Empire and Commonwealth Games. In 1955 he held both the New Zealand Heavyweight Wrestling title and the Auckland Heavyweight Boxing title. He is of Portuguese, African, English and French Tahitian descent. Paul Silva, a competitive wood chopper, was his uncle.

An amateur from 1953, he turned professional after the 1958 Commonwealth Games in Cardiff. He wrestled throughout New Zealand and around the world. He retired in 1977, and subsequently worked with disadvantaged youth. In the 1994 New Year Honours, he was awarded the Queen's Service Medal for community service.

Until his death on 8 April 2021 at the age of 86, he lived on Great Barrier Island. He was the father of boxer Garth da Silva.

Championships and accomplishments
All Star Pro Wrestling
NWA British Empire/Commonwealth Championship (New Zealand version) (6 times)

References

External links
Profile at Online World of Wrestling

1934 births
2021 deaths
Olympic wrestlers of New Zealand
Wrestlers at the 1956 Summer Olympics
New Zealand male sport wrestlers
Commonwealth Games competitors for New Zealand
Wrestlers at the 1958 British Empire and Commonwealth Games
People from Great Barrier Island
Recipients of the Queen's Service Medal
New Zealand male boxers
New Zealand people of Brazilian descent
New Zealand people of French Polynesian descent
New Zealand people of English descent
New Zealand male professional wrestlers
People from Pukekohe
Stampede Wrestling alumni
20th-century New Zealand people
21st-century New Zealand people